José Antonio Rodríguez López (born 12 February 1938 in Megeces, Spain) is a former Spanish footballer.

He played for Atlético de Madrid between 1960 and 1964, winning the Spanish Cup in 1960, 1961, and 1963, and the European Cup Winners Cup in 1962.

External links
 

1938 births
Living people
Spanish footballers
Atlético Madrid footballers
Association football defenders